Punad Dam, is an earthfill dam on Punand river near Nashik in the state of Maharashtra in India.

Specifications

Purpose
 Irrigation

See also
 Dams in Maharashtra
 List of reservoirs and dams in India

References

Dams in Nashik district
Year of establishment missing